Teineite is a tellurite mineral with the formula Cu(TeO3) . 2 H2O. It has a Mohs hardness of 2.5 and it comes in many different shades of blue, ranging from cerulean blue to bluish-gray. The mineral millsite has the same chemical composition, but crystallizes in the monoclinic system, while teineite crystallizes in the orthorhombic system.

Occurrence 
Teineite was first identified in the Teine mine, Sapporo, Hokkaido, Japan, where the name of this mineral originates. It occurs in veins where copper- and tellurium-bearing sulfides were oxidized and is often associated with tellurite, tellurium, pyrite, tetrahedrite, sphalerite, azurite, malachite, quartz, baryte, hessite, galena, bornite, cerussite, chlorargyrite, quetzalcoatlite, cuprite and graemite. It has also been found in other places, including other mines in Japan, several mines in the US and mines in Mexico, Belgium, Russia and Norway.

See also 
 List of minerals

References 

Tellurate and selenate minerals
Copper(II) minerals
Orthorhombic minerals
Minerals in space group 19